The Queensland Railways A10 Fairlie class locomotive was a class of  steam locomotives operated by the Queensland Railways.

History
Per Queensland Railway's classification system they were designated the A10 class, A representing they had two driving axles, and the 10 the cylinder diameter in inches. Because other locomotives also had these features, they were designated as the A10 Fairlie class. They were ordered from the Fairlie Engine Company, but were not Fairlie articulated locomotives. They were built under sub-contract by the Vulcan Foundry and both companies gave them works numbers.

The locomotives were delivered to the Central Railway (Rockhampton) in late 1877, entering service numbered 8 to 10. In March 1881, no.10 was sold only to rail contractor O'Rourke & Co, being repurchased in December 1887. In May 1888, no.8 was transferred to the Normanton Railway and renumbered no.1, with no.10 following as no.2 in December 1888 and no.9 as no.3 in June 1890.

In 1890, they were integrated into the Queensland Railways numbering list as 202-204. Two of these locos were condemned at Normanton in 1895, No.203's boiler was separated from the loco at Normanton and sent to the Clarina pump, where it remains derelict, No.204's boiler was scrapped in 1905 but the frames and wheels remained at Normanton. No.202 was sold to the Pioneer Mill (a gold ore crushing mill) near Croydon in 1906 and last used about 1915.

The A10 Fairlies were rated to haul  up a 1 in 50 (2%) grade.

Preservation
Because of the isolation of the Normanton Railway, none were scrapped. Croydon Shire Council salvaged 202 and made an assessment on restoring it.

References

Railway locomotives introduced in 1877
A10 Fairlie
Vulcan Foundry locomotives
2-4-0 locomotives
3 ft 6 in gauge locomotives of Australia